European route E69 is an E-road between Olderfjord and North Cape in northern Norway. It contains five tunnels, totalling .

During the winter months the northernmost part of the road (Skarsvåg-North Cape) is available only to convoys, driving at fixed times, if weather permits.

E69 is the northernmost road in the world with connections to a major international road network. Roads further north in locations including Svalbard and Greenland are isolated and short.

History 
Number history
In the first version of the current E-road network established in 1975, E69 was a longer and completely different road from Warsaw to Wiener Neustadt through Piotrków, Katowice, Český Těšín, Žilina, Trenčín, Piešťany and Bratislava. This route is now mostly part of E75, and in that time, the E75 went through Kraków and Banská Bystrica, which is now part of E77. It was later modified south from Mattersburg. Instead of Wiener Neustadt, it went further to the south, touching Oberpullendorf and Oberwart following the Austrian route 50, ending in E66. This version was never signposted along roads, instead a modified version was implemented with E75 on this route. In the old version E-road network established in 1950, E69 went between Ålesund and Dombås in Norway, now E136.

The road to North Cape was in 1975 planned as road E45, later E47, going Lübeck-Helsingborg-Oslo-Trondheim-Olderfjord-North Cape. Norway and Sweden wanted to keep the old number E6 to most of this road and got that after some years of negotiation. In 1992, E69 was given its current route. Before that, the road was number 95 in Norway. Since then, it has no distinct national number. 

Construction history
The road Olderfjord–Honningsvåg was planned in the 1930s, particularly after a public meeting in Honningsvåg in 1934, as a means of drawing tourism to offset the loss of lucrative fishing rights, shortly after the area got the first road connection with Southern Norway. The road between Honningsvåg and North Cape was opened in 1956.

The North Cape Tunnel and the Honningsvåg Tunnel were opened in 1999, thereby eliminating the ferry. From then to 29 June 2012, the North Cape Tunnel and adjacent tunnels were tolled.

The  near the southern end of E69 opened in 1968 and is a bottleneck. Therefore, a new tunnel is being built in 2019–2022, which also will shorten the route by 2 km.

References

External links 
 UN Economic Commission for Europe: Overall Map of E-road Network (2007)

69
E069
E069
Roads within the Arctic Circle